Bartholomew of Bologna (died 1333), also known as Bartholomaeus Parvus (the Little), was a Dominican missionary, sent by Pope John XXII to Cilician Armenia, where he interacted with the Armenian nobles and the ruling Mongols.

Bartholomew was consecrated a bishop, in charge of the city of Maragha.  Arriving around 1318–1320, he learned the local language, built a monastery, and set to work converting many Armenians, including Nestorians and Muslims. He later moved as bishop to Nachidiewan.

References

 

1333 deaths
Italian Dominicans
Italian Roman Catholic missionaries
Year of birth unknown
Roman Catholic missionaries in Asia
Dominican missionaries